The Alfred Dunhill Cup was a team golf tournament which ran from 1985 to 2000, sponsored by Alfred Dunhill Ltd. It was for three-man teams of professional golfers, one team representing each country, and was promoted as the "World Team Championship". It was a "special approved event" on the European Tour, which means that it was supported by the Tour, but the prize money did not count towards the Tour's Order of Merit. The host course was the Old Course at St Andrews in Scotland.

The stature of the members of the American team was variable as the Dunhill Cup clashed with a PGA Tour event, though the fact that it was played at "The Home of Golf" helped to attract some star names. The other countries were generally represented by their best three golfers, or nearly so.

The Dunhill Cup was in competition with the World Cup, a similar event for two-man teams. In 2000, the World Cup's status was enhanced by its inclusion in the World Golf Championships series, and in 2001 the promoters of the Alfred Dunhill Cup replaced it with the Alfred Dunhill Links Championship, which is a celebrity pro-am tournament and an official European Tour event.

Format
The field was always 16 teams of three players each. From 1985 to 1991, they compete in a single-elimination tournament that included a third place match. Beginning in 1992, the format switched to group play followed by a single-elimination tournament. The first three days were round-robin play amongst four groups of four teams to determine the semi-finalists. The semi-finals and the final were both played on the Sunday and the third place match was eliminated. The tournament was always played using medal match play.

Winners

Results table

References

External links
Coverage on the European Tour's official site

 
Team golf tournaments
Unofficial money golf tournaments
Golf tournaments in Scotland
Defunct golf tournaments
Sport in Fife
Recurring sporting events established in 1985
Recurring sporting events disestablished in 2000
1985 establishments in Scotland
2000 disestablishments in Scotland